Kevin Joseph Prindiville (born 18 September 1949) is an Australian former cricketer who played for the Western Australia cricket team from 1978 to 1979. The older brother of Terry Prindiville, who also played cricket for Western Australia, he played mainly as a middle-order batsman, appearing in three first-class matches.

He was educated at Aquinas College in Perth.

References

1949 births
Australian cricketers
Living people
People educated at Aquinas College, Perth
Cricketers from Perth, Western Australia
Western Australia cricketers